Sunday 8PM is Faithless' second album, released on 28 September 1998. The album contains the hit singles "Bring My Family Back", "Take the Long Way Home", and "God Is a DJ". The album reached number 10 on the UK Albums Chart. In 1999, Sunday 8PM was one of twelve albums to make the shortlist for the Mercury Prize.

Versions
In 1998, there was a special release in the Netherlands: The Pinkpop Edition, which included a bonus CD with four live recordings ("God Is a DJ", "Bring My Family Back", "Do My Thing", and "If Lovin' You Is Wrong") from the Pinkpop festival of June 1998.

In 1999, the album was re-released as Sunday 8PM / Saturday 3AM, containing an extra CD with mixed versions.

The image on the album/CD cover is the Bluebird Theatre in Denver, Colorado, United States.

Track listing

Charts

Weekly charts

Year-end charts

Certifications and sales

References

Faithless albums
Cheeky Records albums
1998 albums
Albums produced by Rollo Armstrong